The Lake Rukwa squeaker (Synodontis rukwaensis) is a species of upside-down catfish found in the Lake Rukwa drainage in Tanzania. This species grows to a length of  TL.

References

External links 

Lake Rukwa squeaker
Fish of Lake Rukwa
Lake Rukwa squeaker
Lake Rukwa squeaker
Taxonomy articles created by Polbot